Baad Pakh is a district in Laghman Province, Afghanistan.

References 

Districts of Laghman Province